Graham Smith (born 8 August 1951) is an English retired professional football midfielder and forward who appeared in the Football League for Brentford.

Career statistics

References

1951 births
English footballers
English Football League players
Brentford F.C. players
Living people
Footballers from Wimbledon, London
Association football central defenders
Wimbledon F.C. players
Hillingdon Borough F.C. players
Dulwich Hamlet F.C. players
Southern Football League players
Isthmian League players